Lance White is a Canadian politician.

Lance White may also refer to:
Lance White (basketball), American college basketball coach
Lance White, a character played by Tom Selleck on The Rockford Files